Aasukalda is a village in Viru-Nigula Parish, Lääne-Viru County, in northeastern Estonia.  It has a population of 27 (as of 1 January 2010).

Pada org pine tree is located in Aasukalda village, its parameters are: perimeter 5,2 m; height 14 m.

References

Villages in Lääne-Viru County